Waikiki (also known as Waikiki Mission) is a 1980 American action crime drama television film that originally aired on ABC. Directed by Ron Satlof, it stars Dack Rambo, Steve Marachuk, Donna Mills, Tanya Roberts, Cal Bellini, and Darren McGavin and follows a pair of private detectives called on to investigate the bizarre serial murders of young women in Waikiki.

Plot
Two private detectives who operate out of a Waikiki discotheque are called on to investigate the bizarre serial murders of young women.

Cast
Dack Rambo as Ronnie Browning
Donna Mills as Cassie Howard
Steve Marachuk as David King
Tanya Roberts as Carol
Cal Bellini as Rex
Darren McGavin as Captain Mcguire
Robert F. Lyons as Mark Barrington
Mark Slade as Lloyd Barrington
Branscombe Richmond as Walter Kaamanu
Betty Carvalho as Annie Kaamanu
Jenny Sherman as Amy
Angus Duncan as Joe Farnsworth
Karen Austin as Joanie
Anne-Marie Martin as Penny
Robert Apisa as Kahea
Jack Hisatake as Kona
Tommy Fujiwara	as Coroner
Suzanne Schulman as Lori
Sigrid S. Sundstrom as Terri
Paul Verdier as French tourist
Laura Allen as Party guest
Mark Pinkosh as Surfer boy

Reception
The Los Angeles Times called it "fast and absorbing escapist fare."

References

External links

1980 television films
1980 films
Action television films
Crime television films
American drama television films
ABC network original films
Films with screenplays by Ron Friedman
Films scored by Stu Phillips
Films directed by Ron Satlof
1980s American films